Khokhlovo is an urban locality (a work settlement) in Kaduysky District of Vologda Oblast, Russia. Municipally, it is incorporated as Khokhlovskoye Urban Settlement, one of the two urban settlements in the district. Population:

History
Khokhlovo was known as a village since 1626. In the 19th century, it was part of Cherepovetsky Uyezd of Novgorod Governorate. In June 1918, five uyezds of Novgorod Governorate, including Cherepovetsky Uyezd, were split off to form Cherepovets Governorate, with the administrative center in Cherepovets. On August 1, 1927 Cherepovets Governorate was abolished, and its area became Cherepovets Okrug of Leningrad Oblast. Simultaneously, uyezds were abolished, and Kaduysky District was established. On September 23, 1937, Kaduysky District was transferred to newly established Vologda Oblast. In 1979, Khokhlovo became an urban-type settlement.

Economy

Industry
There is a food industry enterprise Ulomskoye and a sawmill, both located in Khokhlovo.

Transportation
A114 highway, connecting Vologda to Cherepovets and Saint Petersburg, runs several kilometers east of Khokhlovo, and the road connecting Kaduy with Cherepovets runs several kilometers north of the settlement.

The closest railway station, Komarikha, is located several kilometers north of Khokhlovo on the railroad connecting Vologda to Saint Petersburg via Cherepovets.

References

Notes

Sources

Urban-type settlements in Vologda Oblast
Populated places in Kaduysky District